Dymond may refer to:

People
 Alfred Hutchinson Dymond (1827−1903), a Canadian writer and politician
 George Dymond (1797–1835), a British architect
 Matthew Dymond (1911–1996), a Canadian politician and physician
 Jonathan Dymond (1796–1828), a British Quaker ethical philosopher
 Dymond (wrestling), American valet and professional wrestler

Other uses
 Dymond Creek, a tributary of the Susquehanna River in Pennsylvania, U.S.
 Dymond, Ontario, a Canadian township, now part of Temiskaming Shores

See also
 Diamond (disambiguation)
 Diamant (disambiguation)
 Diament (disambiguation)
 Dimond (disambiguation)
 Dyment (disambiguation)